The Ministry of Housing and Urban Affairs (MoHUA) is a ministry of the Government of India with executive authority over the formulation and administration of the rules and regulations and laws relating to the housing and urban development in India. The ministry was under the charge of Venkaiah Naidu and was given to Hardeep Singh Puri when Naidu was elected Vice President of India. The Ministry became independent from the Ministry of Housing and Urban Poverty Alleviation in 2004, but was later re-merged with it in 2017.

The ministry also published the National City Rating, which ranked the cleanest cities in India, under which Indore was rated as the cleanest.

The ministry announced Smart Cities in India on 27 August 2015.

In July 2019, the ministry released specifications for Metrolite transport system - a cheaper, smaller and slower metro system.

Organisation

Attached Offices
 Central Public Works Department (CPWD)
 Directorate of Estates
 Directorate of Printing
 Land & Development Office

Subordinate Offices
 Town & Country Planning Organisation
 Stationery Office
 Department of Publication

Statutory Bodies
 Delhi Urban Arts Commission
 National Capital Region Planning Board
 National Institute of Urban Affairs
 Rajghat Samadhi Committee
 Delhi Development Authority (DDA)

Central Public Sector Undertakings
 NBCC (India) Limited
 Housing and Urban Development Corporation Limited
 Hindustan Prefab Limited
 National Capital Region Transport Corporation
 Urban Mass Transit Company (UMTC)

Schemes
 Smart Cities Mission
 HRIDAY
 AMRUT
 Urban Transport
 Swachh Bharat Mission
 Cleanest cities in India

Joint ventures
 Delhi Metro
 Chennai Metro
 Kolkata Metro
 Bangalore Metro
 Rapid Metro Gurgaon
 Jaipur Metro
 Mumbai Metro
 Lucknow Metro
 Kochi Metro
 Noida Metro
 Navi Mumbai Metro
 Mumbai Monorail
 Nagpur Metro

List of Ministers

List of Ministers of State

References

External links
 Ministry website

Urban Development
Urban development in India
Housing in India